The BL 12-inch Mark VIII naval gun was one of the first large British rifled breech-loading naval guns designed for the higher pressures generated by the new cordite propellant of the 1890s, and Britain's first large wire-wound gun. It represented a major advance compared to previous British guns.

Naval service 
The gun was installed on the Majestic-class battleships from 1895 and on the Canopus-class battleships from 1899.
During World War I guns removed from the obsolete Majestic class were mounted in Lord Clive-class monitors for shore bombardment.

Land service 
From 1921 to 1926 two guns from the decommissioned battleship HMS Illustrious were in service in the Tyne Turrets for coast defence, north and south of the mouth of the River Tyne in the northeast of England.

Problems in service 
During bombardment service when mounted in the Lord Clive-class monitors deposition of copper from the projectile driving bands needed frequent removal. However, problems with the inner liners were more serious.  The continual drag of the driving bands caused the liner to be gradually stretched forward. The resulting protrusion at the muzzle could simply be cut off, but in addition the liner began to form a ridge in the barrel near the shoulders of the outer ‘A’ tube, where the inner ‘A’ tube was keyed to the outer.
The ridge accumulated copper from the driving bands, which could give sufficient retardation to the projectile to start the fuze, which resulted in a premature detonation either within the bore, or soon after leaving the muzzle.  This happened several times during bombardment service, including an occasion when Lord Clive showered pieces of shell over the French destroyer Aventurier.
The ‘steel choke’ restriction could be temporarily removed by rubbing down with an emery-covered block pulled back and forth in the bore, but the only permanent cure was to fit new guns with a modified design of liner, which had a different arrangement of internal shoulders.

Images

See also 
 List of naval guns

Weapons of comparable role, performance and era 
 12"/35 caliber gun - contemporary US Navy weapon
 12-inch gun M1895 - contemporary US Army coast defence weapon
 Canon de 305 mm Modèle 1893/96 gun - contemporary French naval and railway weapon

Notes

References

Bibliography 
 Text Book of Gunnery , 1902. London: Printed for His Majesty's Stationery Office, by Harrison and Sons, St. Martin's Lane
 I. V. Hogg & L. F. Thurston, British Artillery Weapons & Ammunition 1914–1918. London: Ian Allan, 1972.
 Tony DiGiulian, British 12"/35 (30.5 cm) Mark VIII

External links 

Naval guns of the United Kingdom
305 mm artillery
Coastal artillery
Victorian-era weapons of the United Kingdom
World War I naval weapons of the United Kingdom